Hugh Mahon (6 January 1857 – 28 August 1931) was an Australian politician. He was a member of the Australian Labor Party (ALP) and held ministerial office in the party's earliest governments. He served terms as Postmaster-General (1904), Minister for Home Affairs (1908–1909), and Minister for External Affairs (1914–1916). However, Mahon is chiefly known as the only person to be expelled from the Parliament of Australia, for making "seditious and disloyal utterances" about the British Empire. He failed to win his seat back at the by-election.

Early life
Mahon was born at Killurin, near Tullamore, then King's County, now County Offaly, Ireland and migrated in 1869 with his family to Canada and the United States, where he learnt the printing trade.  He returned to Ireland in about 1880 and worked as editor of the New Ross Standard, reporting on the infamous Shanbogh killing as well as helping to organise the defence of the two accused. He was actively involved in the boycotting campaign of the Irish National Land League and was jailed in 1881 along with other Irish National Land League leaders, including Charles Stewart Parnell, but was released due to ill-health.  He emigrated to Australia in 1882 to avoid re-arrest and helped to organise the Australian tour of the Irish nationalist leaders John and William Redmond in 1883. He then worked for newspapers in Goulburn and Sydney, before acquiring a newspaper in Gosford.  In 1888 he married Mary Alice L'Estrange of Melbourne. After failing to be elected to the seat of Wollombi at the 1891 NSW parliamentary elections, Mahon  sold his newspaper and moved to Melbourne, where he worked for the Australian Mining Standard.  In 1895, he moved to the Western Australian goldfields and started a newspaper, The Menzies Miner, at the mining town of Menzies.

Political career

Colonial politics

In 1897 Mahon stood unsuccessfully for the state seat of North Coolgardie and the following year he was appointed editor of the Kalgoorlie Sun, a salacious newspaper similar to John Norton's Truth, in which he regularly denounced the Forrest government for alleged corrupt practices. Mahon's notoriety as a fighting editor helped him to win the new federal seat of Coolgardie at the 1901 election for Labour.

Federal politics
Upon entry into federal parliament, Mahon gained a reputation for savage wit and bitter sarcasm. He advocated a humanitarian approach to colonial governance, calling for a royal commission into the treatment of Aboriginal people in WA and for an amendment to the Constitution to give the federal parliament power to pass laws relating to Aboriginal people in the states, an amendment not realised until the 1967 referendum. Yet, as historian Jane Lydon notes, Mahon did not see Aboriginal people as equals, advocating "sympathetic but undeviating treatment." He was also a strong supporter of the White Australia Policy. In 1905 Mahon helped shepherd through both houses of parliament resolutions in support of Irish home rule. Thereafter he became increasingly identified as an advocate of Irish nationalism. In 1907 Cardinal Patrick Moran invited him to deliver the St Patrick's Day address in Sydney. In 1909 he was a key player in the St Patrick's Day celebrations in Melbourne, addressed by the Governor General. In July 1910 he moved a resolution in the House of Representatives requesting the new king George V to omit from the coronation oath references offensive to Catholics.

He was Postmaster-General in the Watson government in 1904 and Minister for Home Affairs in the Fisher government of 1908–09. In the latter role he directed the District Surveyor, Charles Scrivener, to examine the Yass-Canberra district to determine the most suitable place for the seat of government.

In 1913, the seat of Coolgardie was abolished and partly replaced by Dampier, for which he stood unsuccessfully. He re-entered Parliament in the seat of Kalgoorlie; following the death of the incumbent, Charlie Frazer, a by-election was called, but at the close of nominations on 22 December 1913 Mahon was the sole candidate and was declared elected unopposed.  Appointed an assistant minister after the 1914 elections, Mahon became Minister for External Affairs in December 1914 on the death of John Arthur.

Mahon held that position until the Labor Party split in November 1916 over conscription and he resigned from Prime Minister Billy Hughes' cabinet. Although not opposed in principle to conscription, Mahon believed it was not justified at that particular time. He kept a low profile during the referendum debate, but in the last week of campaigning an article claiming he supported a Yes vote forced him to clarify his position. His refusal to endorse the government's conscription proposal soured his relations with Hughes. At the 'khaki election' in 1917 Mahon lost his seat, but he won it back in 1919.

Expulsion from parliament
As the Irish War of Independence, which had begun in 1919, intensified Mahon gradually moved from a position of support for home rule to one of support for Sinn Féin. After the death in October 1920 of the Irish nationalist Terence MacSwiney, who had been on hunger strike, Mahon attacked British policy in Ireland at an open-air meeting in Melbourne on 7 November, claiming that the sobs of MacSwiney's widow would one day shake the foundations of ‘this bloody and accursed Empire’. On 11 November the Prime Minister Billy Hughes moved to expel him and early the following morning the House of Representatives passed a resolution that Mahon had made "seditious and disloyal utterances at a public meeting," and was "guilty of conduct unfitting him to remain a member of this House and inconsistent with the oath of allegiance which he has taken as a member of this House".

According to Mahon's biographer Jeff Kildea, it is this singular event for which he is mostly remembered "despite his long and eventful career in journalism, business and politics both in Ireland and Australia".

Mahon failed to win back his seat at the December 1920 Kalgoorlie by-election, suffering a 3.5 percent swing.

When the Labor Party returned to government in 1929 Mahon sought to have his expulsion motion rescinded. But there was little interest in the caucus to revisit the matter. In 1984 a joint select committee of the parliament criticised his expulsion as an ‘abuse of power by a partisan vote’ and in 1987 legislation was passed removing the parliament's power to expel its members. In 2016, Labor MP Graham Perrett moved a private member's motion in Parliament to recognise that Mahon's expulsion was unjust and a misuse of power then invested by the House. The motion lapsed. In 2020, during the centenary year of Mahon's expulsion, a further attempt was being made to have the parliament acknowledge the injustice done to Mahon.

Mahon's expulsion is often referred to in the media when a member of parliament misbehaves and calls are made to expel that person.

Later life
After leaving parliament, Mahon continued to work as the managing director of the Catholic Church Property Insurance Co., the insurance company he had established in 1912 at the request of the Catholic bishops. In December 1921 he sailed to Europe for the  Irish Race Convention  in  Paris.  However,  struck  down  by illness he missed the conference. After recovering  he went to Rome and had an audience with Pope Pius XI  before  visiting  Ireland. This was the first and only time he returned to his native land after his exile forty years before. While in Ireland Mahon attended a large family reunion near Tullamore and gave a controversial interview to the Irish press in support of the Anglo-Irish treaty in which he criticised the Irish Labour Party. On  returning  to  Australia  in  June 1922 Mahon expected to be appointed Consul General  for Ireland, but the Civil War put an end to that.

Death
In August 1931, while in Sydney for a meeting of the  board of the Catholic Church Property Insurance Co, he fell ill  and on his return to Melbourne succumbed to the lung  disease that had plagued him all his life. He died on 28  August 1931 and is buried in Box Hill Cemetery. He was survived by his wife and four children. Debate in parliament on the usual condolence motion was interrupted when a Country Party member, Roland Green, a veteran of the war who had lost a leg in the conflict, stormed out of the chamber after declaring he could not support the motion because of Mahon's attack on the Empire. To Green and others like him, Mahon's words still rankled a decade or more after the event. Not all agreed. Another ardent Irish nationalist, the Catholic Archbishop of Melbourne, Daniel Mannix, said of him, ‘The late Mr Hugh Mahon was [my] personal and honoured friend. ... The late Mr Mahon had been a good Irishman, a good Australian and an exemplary Catholic’.

References

1857 births
1931 deaths
19th-century Irish people
Politicians from County Offaly
Australian Labor Party members of the Parliament of Australia
Australian ministers for Foreign Affairs
Irish emigrants to colonial Australia
Members of the Australian House of Representatives for Coolgardie
Members of the Australian House of Representatives for Kalgoorlie
Members of the Cabinet of Australia
People expelled from public office
20th-century Australian politicians
People from Tullamore, County Offaly